Max Westphal and Coleman Wong were the reigning champions, but Westphal was no longer eligible to participate in junior events. Wong partnered Edas Butvilas, but lost in the first round to Aidan Kim and Learner Tien.

Ozan Baris and Nishesh Basavareddy won the title, defeating Dylan Dietrich and Juan Carlos Prado Ángelo in the final, 6–1, 6–1.

Seeds

Draw

Finals

Top half

Bottom half

References

External links 
 Main draw

Boys' Doubles
US Open (tennis) by year – Boys' doubles